Ahmed Gasmi (born November 22, 1984) is an Algerian footballer who plays for  RC Kouba in the Algerian Ligue 2.

Club career
On June 27, 2010, Gasmi signed a one-year contract with JSM Béjaïa, joining them on a free transfer from USM Annaba.

International career
On October 29, 2009, Gasmi was called up to the Algeria A' National Team by head coach Abdelhak Benchikha for the first time for a week-long training camp. On March 3, 2010, Gasmi made his official debut for the team starting in a 4-0 win over Lichtenstein.

Honours
 USM Alger
 Algerian Cup: 2012–13
 UAFA Club Cup: 2012–13
 Algerian Super Cup: 2013
 Ligue 1: 2013-14

References

External links
 
 

1984 births
Living people
Sportspeople from Skikda
Algerian footballers
Algeria A' international footballers
Algerian Ligue Professionnelle 1 players
JSM Béjaïa players
MC El Eulma players
USM Alger players
USM Annaba players
2011 African Nations Championship players
Algeria international footballers
NA Hussein Dey players
ES Sétif players
Association football forwards
21st-century Algerian people